"Little Bit of Lovin'" is a song by British R&B singer Kele Le Roc. It was released as a single on 19 October 1998 as the first single from her 1999 debut album, Everybody's Somebody, and peaked at  8 on the UK Singles Chart. It also reached No. 1 on the UK R&B Chart and No. 100 in the Netherlands.

Track listings
UK CD and cassette single
 "Little Bit of Lovin'" (7-inch Rude Boy edit) – 4:05
 "Let Me Know" – 4:32

UK, European and Australian maxi-CD single
 "Little Bit of Lovin'" (7-inch Rude Boy edit) – 4:05
 "Little Bit of Lovin'" (Tuff Jam's classic garage mix) – 6:47
 "Little Bit of Lovin'" (Soul Power vocal nix) – 4:00
 "Little Bit of Lovin'" (Tic Tac mix) – 3:34

Charts

Weekly charts

Year-end charts

References

1998 songs
1998 singles
First Avenue Records singles
Kele Le Roc songs
Polydor Records singles
Songs written by Gordon Chambers
Songs written by Robbie Nevil